The Byzantine–Seljuk wars were a series of conflicts in the Middle Ages between the Byzantine Empire and the Seljuk Empire. They shifted the balance of power in Asia Minor and Syria from the Byzantines to the Seljuk dynasty. Riding from the steppes of Central Asia, the Seljuks replicated tactics practiced by the Huns hundreds of years earlier against a similar Roman opponent but now combining it with new-found Islamic zeal. In many ways, the Seljuk resumed the conquests of the Muslims in the Byzantine–Arab Wars initiated by the Rashidun, Umayyad and Abbasid Caliphates in the Levant, North Africa and Asia Minor.

The Battle of Manzikert of 1071 is widely regarded as the turning point against the Byzantines in their war against the Seljuks. However the Byzantine military was of questionable quality before 1071 with regular Turkish incursions overrunning the failing theme system. Even after Manzikert, Byzantine rule over Asia Minor did not end immediately, nor were any heavy concessions levied by the Turks on their opponents – it took another 20 years before the Turks were in control of the entire Anatolian peninsula and not for long either.

During the course of the war, the Seljuk Turks and their allies attacked the Fatimid Caliphate of Egypt, capturing Jerusalem and catalyzing the call for the First Crusade. Crusader assistance to the Byzantine Empire was mixed with treachery and looting, although substantial gains were made in the First Crusade. Within a hundred years of Manzikert, the Byzantines had successfully driven back the Seljuk Turks from the coasts of Asia Minor and extended their influence right down to Palestine and even Egypt. Later, the Byzantines were unable to extract any more assistance, and the Fourth Crusade even led to the sack of Constantinople in 1204. Before the conflict ended, the Seljuks managed to take more territory from the weakened Empire of Nicaea until the sultanate itself was taken over by the Mongols, leading to the rise of the ghazi and the conclusive Byzantine–Ottoman wars.

Origins 

The decades after the death of the Byzantine emperor Basil II saw a long series of crises and a severe weakening of imperial authority and military power. This included a succession crisis and a series of weak Emperors under the increasing influence of bureaucrats in Constantinople. At the same time the efforts to restrain the ambitious provincial aristocrats kept at bay during Basil II reign failed. With the successes of the previous century, the Byzantine state had acquired more land and wealth. The spoils of war saw the enrichment of the military aristocracy. More and more land owned by free peasants came under the control of the dynatoi class by varying means from purchase to intimidation to outright robbery. One major consequence of this was the reduction in available manpower to serve in the imperial armies. Added to this were the internal rivalry between the bureaucrats and military aristocracy. Bureaucrats sought to reduce the power and likelihood of the aristocrats to launch rebellions by freeing the yeomanry of military duty in place of providing tax revenue. This further put strain on the manpower needed to defend imperial territory. The factions increasingly relied on mercenaries, but these highly ambitious soldiers were unreliable and lawless.

For the twenty years preceding 1070, in almost every year there saw at least one major rebellion, including a large revolt of Armenians. This caused thematic armies to be drawn west or east depending on the rebellion and opened the borders to incursions by raiders whether the Normans of Sicily or Turkic horsemen from Central Asia or indeed the mercenaries roaming within the state. In addition, a combination of competition, rivalry and treachery between pretenders to the imperial throne saw the state paralysed to deal with the many issues facing the state.

By 1070 during the march on Manzikert, the Byzantine state was in a very precarious position largely of its own making, even on the verge of collapse and failed to secure the Empire against external threats. The biggest threat to the Empire since the Arab invasions were the Turks. The Turks were much like the Byzantines former enemies, the Huns. Combining their excellent riding skills with Islamic zeal, the Turks were to become a formidable enemy to a Christian state in decline.

As the Byzantines were making headway against the Arabs in the 10th century, Persia was being ruled by the Ghaznavids, another Turkic people. The migration of Seljuk Turks into Persia in the 10th century led to the Ghaznavids being overthrown. There they settled and adopted Persian language and customs. The first encounter with the Byzantine Empire was in the Battle of Kapetron in 1048, in which the combined Byzantine-Georgian army won a tactical victory. Nevertheless, the Seljuks established a powerful domain and captured Baghdad in 1055 from the Abbasid Caliphate. The Abbasids were henceforth a mere figurehead in the Islamic world. The Seljuk Turks, spurred on by their previous success, now launched an attack on the Levant and against Fatimid Egypt, which lost Jerusalem in 1071.

When the Seljuk Turks did encounter the Byzantines, they had chosen a good time to attack. Byzantium was faced with weak rule, Norman conquests and the schism whilst the Abbasid Caliphate had recently been seriously weakened with its wars against the Fatimid dynasty.

Initial Conflicts: 1064–1071 

Ever since early in the 11th century, the Seljuk Turks from central Asia had been expanding westward, defeating various Arab factions and occupying the Abbasid caliphate's power base in Baghdad. At the same time, the Byzantine empire was making a few gains in Edessa and Syria. In 1067 the Seljuk Turks invaded Asia Minor attacking Caesarea and, in 1069, Iconium. A Byzantine counterattack in 1069 drove the Seljuk Turks back from these lands. Further offensives by the Byzantine army drove the Turks back across the Euphrates.

Despite this, the Seljuk Turks continued their incursions into Asia Minor, capturing Manzikert. The Byzantine Emperor Romanus Diogenes led an army in an attempt to score a decisive blow against the Seljuks and add some military justification to his rule (which had seen the Norman conquest of southern Italy). During the march, Alp Arslan, the leader of the Seljuk Turks withdrew from Manzikert. His tactical withdrawal allowed his army to ambush the Byzantines, winning the decisive Battle of Manzikert on 26 August 1071. The victory itself led to few gains at the time for the Seljuk Turks, but the civil chaos that resulted in the Byzantine Empire allowed the Seljuks and various other Turkic allies to swarm into Asia Minor.

Turkic Conquests: 1071–1096 

After Manzikert, the Seljuk Turks concentrated on their eastern territorial gains which were threatened by the Fatimid dynasty in Egypt although Alp Arslan encouraged other allied Turks and vassals to establish Beyliks in Asia Minor. Many Byzantines at the time did not see the victory as a total disaster and when the Turks began occupying the countryside in Anatolia they began to garrison the Byzantine cities as well, not as foreign conquerors but as mercenaries requested by various Byzantine factions – one Byzantine Emperor even gave the city of Nicaea's defense to the invading Turks in 1078.

The result of the civil war meant that pretenders to the Byzantine throne sought Turkic aid by conceding Byzantine territory. The loss of these cities such as Nicaea and another defeat in Anatolia led to a prolongation of the war. The civil conflict finally ended when Alexius I Komnenos, who had been leading Imperial armies to defeat revolts in Asia Minor became a rebel himself and seized the Byzantine throne in 1081. Despite emergency reforms implemented by Alexius, Antioch and Smyrna were lost by 1084. However, between 1078 and 1084 Antioch had been in the hands of Philaretos Brachamios, an Armenian renegade. By 1091, the few remaining Byzantine towns in Asia Minor inherited by Alexius were lost as well. However, all was not to end in defeat for Byzantium; in 1091, a combined Seljuk/Pecheneg invasion and siege of Constantinople was thoroughly defeated whilst the Norman invasions had been held back as well allowing the Empire to focus its energies against the Turks. The Byzantines were thus able to recover the Aegean islands from Tzachas and destroy his fleet, and even regain the southern littoral of the Marmara Sea in 1094.

In 1094, Alexius Comnenus sent a message to Pope Urban II asking for weapons, supplies and skilled troops. At the Council of Clermont in 1095, the Pope preached a Crusade to be undertaken in order to capture Jerusalem and, in the process, assist the Byzantine Empire which could no longer guard Christendom in the East from Islamic aggression. Though the Crusades would assist the Byzantine Empire in reconquering many vital Anatolian towns, it also led to the dissolution of the Empire in 1204 during which time the Byzantines struggled to hold on to their territories.

Devastation of Anatolia
After hearing of the overthrow of Byzantine Emperor Romanos IV Diogenes and realizing the great tribute and concessions promised to him would be denied, Sultan Alp Arslan pledged: “I shall consume with the sword all those people who venerate the cross, and all the lands of the Christians shall be enslaved.” According to Matthew of Edessa, Alp Arslan ordered the Turks: "Henceforth all of you be like lion cubs and eagle young, racing through the countryside day and night, slaying the Christians and not sparing any mercy on the Roman nation."

“The emirs spread out, like locusts, over the face of the land....”invading every corner of Anatolia, sacking some of ancient Christianity’s most important cities, including Ephesus, Nicaea, and Antioch (as well as enslaved many).

Apostolos Vakalopoulos Describes the Devastation the seljuk raids had on Anatolia: "Seljuk Turks forced their way into Armenia and there crushed the armies of several petty Armenian states. No fewer than forty thousand souls fled before the organized pillage of the Seljuk host to the western part of Asia Minor. From the middle of the eleventh century, and especially after the battle of Malazgirt [Manzikurt], the Seljuks spread throughout the whole Asia Minor peninsula, leaving terror, panic and destruction in their wake. Byzantine, Turkish and other contemporary sources are unanimous in their agreement on the extent of havoc wrought and the protracted anguish of the local population…evidence as we have proves that the Hellenic population of Asia Minor, whose very vigor had so long sustained the Empire and might indeed be said to have constituted its greatest strength, succumbed so rapidly to Turkish pressure that by the fourteenth century, it was confined to a few limited areas. By that time, Asia Minor was already being called Turkey…one after another, bishoprics and metropolitan sees which once throbbed with Christian vitality became vacant and ecclesiastical buildings fell into ruins. The metropolitan see of Chalcedon, for example, disappeared in the fourteenth century, and the sees of Laodicea, Kotyaeon (now Kutahya) and Synada in the fifteenth. With the extermination of local populations or their precipitate flight, entire villages, cities, and sometimes whole provinces fell into decay. Fertile districts like the valley of the Maeander River, once stocked with thousands of sheep and cattle, were laid waste and thereafter ceased to be in any way productive. Other districts were literally transformed into wildernesses. Impenetrable thickets sprang up in places where once there had been luxuriant fields and pastures. The extent of devastation elsewhere was such as to make a profound impression on visitors for may years to come."

Quoting contemporary authorities, J. Laurent writes: “It is difficult even to imagine the complete ruin the Turks left behind them. Whatever they could reach, men or crops, nothing remained alive; and a week was sufficient under dread of famine to force them to abandon the most prosperous areas. On their departure all that was left were devastated fields, trees cut down, mutilated corpses and towns driven mad by fear or in flames.’”’ At Armorium, it is said, 100,000 people perished, and at Touch 120,000 were massacred and 150,000 sold into slavery—thus the destruction went on. Whole districts were depopulated. ‘When the Turks had passed by, such as were left alive feared to return...trusting in neither the walls of their cities, nor the crags of the mountains, they crowded into Constantinople where they were decimated by plague. In a few years Cappadocia, Phrygia, Bithynia, and Paphlagonia lost the greater part of their Greek population. J. Laurent writes further:“In brief, the population of Asia Minor vanished before the Turks. The people fled far away, or shut themselves up in their Cities, or sought refuge in the mountains which border the central plateau of the peninsula. The valleys and the plains which stretch from Caesarea and Sebaste to Nicaea and Sardes remained all but empty. And as they fell fallow, the Turks with their tents and their flocks wandered over them contentedly, as they had done in the deserts out of which they had come".

Byzantine princess Anna Komnene says:

News of the great tribulation and persecutions of the eastern Christians reached European Christians in the west in the few years after the battle of manzikert. A frankish eyewitness says: "Far and wide they [Muslim Turks] ravaged cities and castles together with their settlements. Churches were razed down to the ground. Of the clergyman and monks whom they captured, some were slaughtered while others were with ubspeakable wickedness given up, priests and all, to their dire dominion and nuns—alas for the sorrow of it!—were subjected to their lusts." The situation became so bad that the Byzantines were forced to call for help from the Western Europeans. In a letter to count Robert of Flanders, Byzantine emperor Alexios I Komnenos writes:

Byzantium Survives: 1096–1118 
The first Crusaders arrived in 1096 following Alexius' appeal to the West. The agreement between the Byzantines and the Crusaders was that any Byzantine cities re-captured from the Turks would be handed over to the Empire.

This was beneficial for the Crusaders as it meant that they did not have to garrison captured towns and lose troop strength whilst maintaining their supply lines. The Byzantines, in return, would supply the Crusaders with food in a hostile territory and Alexius' troops would act as a reserve to reinforce them in any dangerous situations. The Crusaders first set about attacking Nicaea on 6 May 1097. Kilij Arslan I was unable to assist the Turks there due to the immense size of the Crusader armies; another small defeat on 16 May convinced Kilij Arslan to withdraw and abandon the city, which surrendered to the Byzantines on 19 June. After this, a decisive victory at Dorylaeum gave the Crusaders an Asia Minor that was open to attack: Sozopolis, Philomelium, Iconium, Antioch in Pisidia, Heraclea and Caesarea all fell to the Crusaders and they reached as far as Cilicia where they allied with Cilician Armenia.

Unfortunately for Alexius Comnenus, the Byzantines were unable to fully capitalize on these conquests with Caesarea returning to the Seljuks as a part of the Sultanate of Rum along with several other cities such as Iconium, the future capital of the Seljuk Turks. However, in a campaign in 1097 John Doukas, the megas doux (Alexios' brother-in-law), led both land and sea forces which re-established firm Byzantine control of the Aegean coastline and many inland districts of western Anatolia, taking the cities of Smyrna, Ephesus, Sardis, Philadelphia, Laodicea and Choma from the demoralised Turks.

Following their victories, the Crusaders went on to lay siege to Antioch a city under Seljuk occupation. The siege marked the end of Crusader assistance to the Byzantines due to the simulations of Stephen of Blois. Kerbogha the Seljuk governor of Mosul, had a huge army of 75,000 troops sent to relieve Antioch; his unsuccessful siege of Edessa (a city that had recently fallen to the Crusaders) allowed the Crusaders time to capture Antioch on 3 June 1098, a day before Kerbogah's arrival. Despite this, Kerbogah's troops were able to breach the citadel where vicious and desperate fighting allowed the Crusaders to repulse his offensive. At this point, one of the Crusaders present, Stephen of Blois deserted and reaching Alexius Comnenus warned him that the Crusaders were destroyed and the Byzantine Emperor was forced to turn back.

As a result of this apparent desertion of Alexius I, the Crusaders refused to hand back Antioch when they managed to defeat Kerbogah's scattered army. With this resentment, the Crusaders largely abandoned assisting the Byzantines against the Seljuks and their allies. The follow-on Crusade of 1101 ended in total defeat and the consolidation of Seljuk power in Asia Minor with Iconium (modern day Konya) being established as the capital of the Sultanate of Rûm.

Byzantine counter-attack: 1118–1180 

The death of Alexius I brought John II Comnenus to power. By now, the Seljuk Turks had fractured and became loosely allied to each other. During this time the Sultanate of Rum was busy fighting off their former allies, the Danishmends. John Comnenus was able to use this to his advantage as he undertook a series of campaigns in Anatolia and Syria. John successfully captured the southern coast of Anatolia as far as Antioch, defeated an attempt by the Gabras family to form a breakaway state in Trebizond, and recaptured the ancestral home of the Comnenus family at Kastamonu. Despite this, Turkish resistance was strong and John did not capture the Seljuk capital at Iconium, nor were all of his conquests held – the city of Gangra, captured by John in the 1130s, was lost again as the emperor had left it with a garrison of just 2,000 men.

John spent considerable time and effort on a series of campaigns in Syria, which emphasised his dominance over the local Crusader kingdoms, especially Edessa and Antioch, but resulted in no long-term territorial gains for the Byzantine Empire. The emperor did strengthen the Byzantine army by recruiting new divisions and establishing new castles, fortifications and training camps in Byzantine territory. However, the scale of resources poured into his campaigns in Syria was far greater than in Anatolia, suggesting that John viewed prestige as more important than long-term conquest. In 1143, a fatal hunting accident to the emperor John robbed the Byzantines of the opportunity to achieve further progress.

John II died in 1143, leaving the Byzantine Empire a strong army, significant reserves of cash, and improved prestige. However, the new emperor, Manuel Comnenus, directed much of his attention to Hungary, Italy, Serbia and the Crusader states rather than Anatolia. While Manuel was largely successful in defeating attacks on the empire and holding the Balkans, his policy in Italy was a failure and the lavish expenditure of his rule has been criticised, most notably by the Byzantine historian Choniates. During this period, the Seljuk Turks were able to subdue their enemies, the Danishmends, under Kilij Arslan II. This resulted in a powerful centralised Turkish state based at Iconium, leaving the Byzantines arguably in a worse position than they had been under John II.

For the time being, Manuel's policy was not without merit as the emperor established peaceful co-existence with the Sultan and initiated measures such as allowing Turkmen to pay for pasture on Byzantine land, which were clearly meant to deter raiding. The establishment of the theme of Neokastra on the northern part of the Aegean coast near Pergamon was also praised by Choniates. However, when Kilij Arslan refused to hand over the city of Sebastea, which he was bound to do under an earlier agreement with Manuel, the emperor declared war in 1176 and led a very large army estimated at around 30,000 men into Seljuk territory with the intent of taking its capital Iconium. However, the Byzantine force was ambushed in a mountain pass with consequent heavy losses to both sides. This battle, the Battle of Myriokephalon, resulted in the Byzantine campaign of conquest being abandoned.

The battle was tactically indecisive with both leaders keen to seek peace. Following this Manuel's army continued to skirmish with the Turks in Anatolia, defeating them in a smaller but indecisive battle in the Meander Valley. Regardless of this small respite, Myriokephalon had far more decisive implications than the casualties would suggest – there was no more Byzantine reconquest in Asia Minor after 1176, leaving the process begun by Alexios incomplete at best. For the Seljuks, the acquisition of Danishmend territory gave them a victory though once again the Seljuks had to contend with neighbouring disputes leading to the peace treaty as requested by both leaders. By the terms of the treaty, Manuel was obliged to remove the armies and fortifications posted at Dorylaeum and Sublaeum.

However, Manuel Comnenus refused and when Kilij Arslan tried to enforce this treaty, a Turkish army invaded Byzantine territory and sacked a string of Byzantine cities as far as the Aegean coast, damaging the heartland of Byzantine control in the region. Nevertheless, John Vatatzes, who was sent by the Emperor to repel the Turkish invasion scored an ambush victory over the Turks at the Battle of Hyelion and Leimocheir in the Meander valley. The Turkish commander and many of his troops were killed while attempting to flee, and much of the plunder was recovered, an event that has been seen by historians as a sign that the Byzantine army remained strong and that the defensive program of western Asia Minor was still successful. After the victory on the Meander, Manuel himself advanced with a small army to drive the Turks from Panasium and Lacerium, south of Cotyaeum. However, in 1178 a Byzantine army retreated after encountering a Turkish force at Charax, allowing the Turks to capture many livestock. The city of Claudiopolis in Bithynia was besieged by the Turks in 1179, forcing Manuel to lead a small cavalry force to save the city and then, even as late as 1180, the Byzantines succeeded in scoring a victory over the Turks.

However, the continuous warfare did have a serious effect upon Manuel's vitality; he declined in health and in 1180 succumbed to a slow fever. Furthermore, like Manzikert, the balance between the two powers began to gradually shift – after Manuel's death, they began to move further and further west, deeper into Byzantine territory.

Seljuk Empire collapse: 1194–1260 
In 1194, Togrul of the Seljuk empire was defeated by Takash (In Batul), the Shah of Khwarezmid Empire, and the Seljuk Empire finally collapsed. Of the former Seljuk Empire, only the Sultanate of Rûm in Anatolia remained. As the dynasty declined in the middle of the thirteenth century, the Mongols invaded Anatolia in the 1260s and divided it into smaller principalities called the Anatolian beyliks.

Summary 
Though Anatolia had been under Byzantine rule for almost 1000 years, the Seljuks rapidly consolidated their holdings. This allowed them to hold on to their lands and made it all the more difficult for the Byzantines during the Komnenian restoration to re-conquer. The result was that even when the Byzantine empire was not riddled with civil disputes, it could not defeat the Seljuk Turks, who rarely allowed the Byzantines to engage them, hence the slow campaigning of John Komnenus.

The old Roman state was in a constant state of war due to the numerous enemies on its borders; Muslims to the South and East, Slavs to the North and Franks to the West. The Byzantine Empire had to face Normans, Pechenegs and Turks within a few decades of each other at a time when the army was torn in civil conflict.
The Middle East had been dominated for centuries by the power of the Fatimid Caliphate and the Byzantine Empire; by the end of the 13th century, neither of the two were in a position to project power; the Fatimids having been toppled by the Kurdish-influenced Ayyubids, whilst the Byzantines severely weakened by the Seljuks. Power shifted to the Mamluks by the 14th century and then back to the Turks in the late 15th and early 16th centuries. Never again would a Christian Kingdom wield so much military and political power in the Middle East. As the Turks steadily gained ground in Anatolia, the local population converted to Islam, further reducing any chances of a successful reconquest.

The war also gave Western Christendom the opportunity to launch expeditions/pilgrimages to visit/liberate the Holy Land from Muslim Rule. In time, these Crusaders would establish their own fiefs in the Holy Land, ruling with interests coinciding, but more often in conflict with, the Byzantine Empire, ultimately leading to a weakening of both the Crusader states and the Byzantine Empire.

For the Turks, it was the beginning of a new era of power. Despite further invasions and attacks by Crusaders from the west and the Mongols and Turkic tribes from the east, the Turks slowly emerged as a superpower under the Ottomans. The rise of the Ottomans was parallel to the fall of the Sultanate of Rum and the carving up of the Byzantine Empire. The power vacuum left in Anatolia was easily exploited by one of the sultanate's nobles, Osman I. Matters were made worse for the Byzantine Empire due to the Latin presence in the Peloponnese and the rising power of the Bulgarians who continued to press hard against the borders of Byzantium. In time, the Byzantines would be forced to call on the aid of the Ottomans to head to the European mainland and fight the Bulgarians, giving the Ottoman Turks a firm grip on Europe. The close proximity of Osman's Beylik ensured that confrontation between the Byzantines and the Ottomans would be inevitable. The Byzantines were a match for the Ottomans but events west of Constantinople coupled with civil war and incompetent leadership in the Byzantine-Ottoman Wars led to the fall of Constantinople in 1453.

See also 
 Komnenian army
 Byzantine military
 Decline of the Byzantine Empire
 Arab–Byzantine wars
 Byzantine–Ottoman wars

References

Further reading 
 
 
 
 
 
 
 
 
 
 
 
 

11th-century conflicts
12th-century conflicts
13th-century conflicts

11th century in the Byzantine Empire
12th century in the Byzantine Empire
13th century in the Byzantine Empire
Sultanate of Rum